Gretchen Mary Rehberg is the ninth bishop of the Episcopal Diocese of Spokane.

Early life and education
Rehberg was born in Pullman, Washington on July 7, 1964. Her mother, Margaret Rehberg (nee: Boe) was a homemaker and her father, Wallace Rehberg, was a professor at Washington State University. The family had a small farm outside of town.
After graduating from Pullman High School in 1982, Rehberg attended Sewanee: The University of the South.

Rehberg's first doctorate was a Ph.D. in chemistry. She received her Master of Divinity degree from General Theological Seminary in 2002. She later received her Doctor of Ministry degree from Wesley Theological Seminary.

Career
Rehberg was a professor of organic chemistry at Bucknell University until the late 1990s, when she left to enter theological school. For over 20 years, Rehberg volunteered as an EMT and firefighter. She was in New York City on September 11, 2001 and provided first aid to survivors of the World Trade Center attack. Later, she volunteered with a hazmat team doing cleanup at Ground Zero.

Rehberg was rector of the Episcopal Church of the Nativity in Lewiston, Idaho for 11 years prior to her consecration as bishop. She had also held several diocesan leadership positions. On October 18, 2016, she was elected as the ninth bishop of the Episcopal Diocese of Spokane, and she was consecrated at the Episcopal Cathedral of St. John the Evangelist in Spokane on March 18, 2017.

References

External links
 
 Gallery from ordination ceremony

Living people
Women Protestant religious leaders
People from Pullman, Washington
General Theological Seminary alumni
Wesley Theological Seminary alumni
Bucknell University faculty
21st-century American Episcopalians
Year of birth missing (living people)
Women Anglican bishops
Episcopal bishops of Spokane